Bahadur Khan Dahri is a Pakistani politician who had been a Member of the Provincial Assembly of Sindh, from May 2013 to May 2018.

Early life and education
He was born on 22 November 1966 in Daulatpur, Sindh.

He has a degree of Bachelor of Medicine, Bachelor of Surgery.

Political career
He was elected to the Provincial Assembly of Sindh as a candidate of Pakistan Peoples Party from Constituency PS-28 SHAHEED BANAZIR ABAD-V in 2013 Pakistani general election.

References

Living people
Sindh MPAs 2013–2018
1966 births
Pakistan People's Party politicians